The following is a list of episodes for the fourth and final season of the Aikatsu! anime television series produced by BN Pictures, based on the arcade game series by Bandai Namco Entertainment, which aired on TV Tokyo between October 1, 2015 and March 31, 2016. The season follows the idols Akari Ozora, Sumire Hikami, and Hinaki Shinjo as they take their idol unit, Luminas, on a tour across Japan.  The opening theme is "Start Dash Sensation" while the ending theme is "Lucky train!", both performed by Ruka, Mona, and Miki from AIKATSU☆STARS!.

Episodes

References

Aikatsu!
Aikatsu! episode lists
2015 Japanese television seasons